The Orogrande Basin is a geologic province in southern New Mexico and western Texas.  It includes Doña Ana, Sierra, Socorro, Lincoln, and Otero Counties in New Mexico and El Paso County, Texas. The province takes its name from the community of Orogrande, New Mexico.

Geology
The province is named for the Orogrande Basin, which was a shallow marine basin during the Carboniferous. This basin was one of several basins that opened along the southwestern margin of the North American craton due to crustal stress from the Ouachita Orogeny. At this time, this area was very close to the equator. These included sediments from a Carboniferous mountain range, the Pedernal Uplift, located to the east.

A narrow shelf, the Sacramento Shelf, was located between the basin and mountain range, and formations in this area from the Carboniferous are notable for their algal mounds. This steep shelf margin gave way further west to a gently-inclined ramp, the Robledo Ramp. The Gobbler Formation is typical of middle Pennsylvanian deposition in the basin. The Orogrande Basin was centered on the present-day Tularosa Basin.

References

Geologic provinces of Texas
Geology of New Mexico
Sedimentary basins of North America